Grapple Dog is a 2022 platform game developed by Joseph Gribbin. The game stars Pablo, a dog who traverses through 2D levels using his grappling hook to deal with platforming and enemies.

The game was released for Windows, Nintendo Switch and later the Xbox Series X. On Metacritic, the game received an average of 76/100 indicating "generally favorable reviews".

Gameplay
Grapple Dog is a 2D platformer. The player controls Pablo the dog, using his grappling hook which is used to swing and pull Pablo toward enemies over platforms.

The goal of each stage is to ring a bell at the end of the level. Throughout the stage, there are items to collect such as five purple gems hidden throughout the level. Two other purple gems can be collected by collecting oranges, of which there are 250 per level, and 220 are required to acquire the gems.

Development
Grapple Dog was made independently by Joseph Gribbin of Medallion Games. Gribbin was the game designer, artist and programmer for the game while Jazz Mickle provided the game's soundtrack.

Reception

Grapple Dog was released on February 10, 2022, for Nintendo Switch and Windows. It was later released on Xbox Series X on November 18, 2022.

Will Nelson of the NME recommended the game to platform game fans, stating that the game "aims to claim its place among the pantheon of mascot platformers, and it gets incredibly close."

Nelson found that some of the mechanics to used alongside the grapple ranged from "brilliant" to frustrating due to the slightly imprecise nature of the grappling hook. J.P. Corban of the NintendoWorldReport echoed this, stating " since you can only aim the grappling hook straight up or at a 45-degree angle, there are times when it feels like you should be able to hook onto something but miss."

Ethan Gach included Grapple Dog in his list of Fantastic games that went under the radar for Kotaku. Gach declared the game as "one of the tightest arcade games of the year" praising swinging mechanics as "tricky but rewarding" and that it had "boss fights occasionally border on greatness when they aren't feeling overly punishing."

References

Footnotes

Sources

External links
Grapple Dog at Medallion Games
Grapple Dog at Joseph Gribbin's personal website

2022 video games
Platform games
Indie video games
Nintendo Switch games
Single-player video games
Windows games
Xbox Series X and Series S games
Retro-style video games
Video games developed in the United Kingdom
Video games about dogs